Erskine Hazard (1790-1865), a younger son of the first U.S. Postmaster Ebenezer Hazard, became the partner of Josiah White about 1810 when around 19 years old. White and Hazard together established spearheaded efforts that enabled the Industrial Revolution, the advancement of steam power, and of railroading, creating the infrastructure and business climate to accelerate the Northeast U.S. out of an agrarian society to the industrial power that served as a foundation for the rise of the United States as the world's foremost economic power.

The Partnership
Together they put together the wherewithal to open a foundry and wire drawing plant on the falls of the Schuylkill River near Philadelphia in 1810. Their first reputation establishing event was to build a small suspension bridge across the Schuylkill in order to better demonstrate their factory. When the US President put an embargo in place on Bituminous Coal imports from Great Britain in the tension prior to the War of 1812, the partners moved to secure an anthracite supply, which was a barely known, much misunderstood unexploited commodity at that time. Its discovery was credited to various individuals in widely varying locales by different historians but history speaks more clearly about that find which was first to be regularly commercially exploited, and inspire a revolution in energy use in the young United States. It was the outcrop stumbled over by the hunter Philip Ginter in 1791 that lead to the Lehigh Coal Mining Company (LCMC, 1792), then in 1818, the Lehigh Coal Company and the Lehigh Navigation Company a few months afterwards. White and Hazard were principals in both.

Pioneering
Educated as a geographer and surveyor Hazard would complement White's mechanical innovations with resourceful use of given landforms and the two would go on together to found what is arguably the most influential company of the first half of the 19th century, the Lehigh Coal & Navigation Company, build the Lehigh Canal, the Ashley Planes, the Lehigh and Susquehanna Railroad, and a half-dozen other subsidiary railroads and industries, most of which would last into the 1960s. They also had a major role in inspiring the use by others of the hard to burn 'rock coal', anthracite—initially only in industrial processes, and together brought about the opening up of a trickle in supply brought into Philadelphia along the Schuylkill River valley.

Hazard the geographer and surveyor pioneered a technique which became standardized in the rail transport industry, and indeed, adopted in building many roads and ramps; that of dividing the overall height (the rise) from the starting reference point to the destination by the distance (or run)—then setting the grade (regardless of excavations needed, or supports needing constructed) of the road to maintain that average slope.  He used the technique when surveying the initial mule road the Lehigh Coal Company used to connect the new settlement and mines at Summit Hill, Pennsylvania with the loading chute at what would become Jim Thorpe, Pennsylvania. When the company decided to lay rails along the mule trail, the pre-graded slope allowed the workers to lay rails over the nine mile descent in only a few months of conversion.

Legacy
Erskine Hazard died in 1865 a wealthy individual that had, along with partner-mentor Josiah White, created thousands of jobs and founded whole industries unknown in their youth.  Railroading grew up from the early strap iron angles attached to hardwood tracks to T-rails which have common ancestry with today's steel welded rails. Their influence goes farther than listed below, for they made many capital investments, and those which fit their overall coal-iron business were sometimes bought out when they proved successful.  Others in need of additional investment were finished by the two, or by the board of LC&N Co. then either sold off when profitable or retained as part of the LC&N Co. family of subsidiaries, while a third were just investments made part of a portfolio, having no relation to LC&N Co. assets other than that of a common individual owner.

Hazard Street, a primary thorofare in Summit Hill, Pennsylvania, is named in Hazard's honor.

Towns from rural wilderness
Coaldale
East Mauch Chunk
Lansford
Mauch Chunk
Summit Hill
Tamaqua
Tresckow

Companies
 Ashley Planes
 Lehigh & Susquehanna Railroad
 Lehigh Canal
 Lehigh Coal & Navigation Company
 Lehigh Crane Iron Works 
 Panther Creek Railroad
 Panther Creek Valley
 Summit Hill & Mauch Chunk Railroad

References

Footnotes

External links

Erskine Hazard at Find a Grave

1790 births
1865 deaths
American surveyors
American canal engineers
Businesspeople from Philadelphia
19th-century American businesspeople